The men's pole vault competition of the athletics events at the 1979 Pan American Games took place on 14 July at the Estadio Sixto Escobar.

Records
Prior to this competition, the existing world and Pan American Games records were as follows:

Results
All heights shown are in meters.

References

Athletics at the 1979 Pan American Games
1979